Francis Thibaudeau (1860, Cholet, France – 1925, Paris) is a French typographer and creator of the first well-established system for classifying typefaces, the Thibaudeau classification.  He devised his system while developing the catalogues for the Renault & Marcou and G. Peignot & Fils foundries in the early 20th century. He worked at G. Peignot & Fils (1898–1919), Peignot & Cie (1919–1923), and Deberny & Peignot (1923–1925).

His book, La lettre d'imprimerie (The Letter of the Printing Office), is printed in Auriol, a typeface designed by its namesake, George Auriol and reflecting typical Art Nouveau design. In this text, he states clearly his patriotic purpose: "May this work of popularization [...] inspire interest in the nature of the printed letter and then in the art of its use and applications, [...] for the greatest profit of the national industry and the triumph of French art."

References
 Jubert, Roxane. "The Bauhaus Context: Typography and Graphic Design in France." Design Issues. 22.4 (Autumn 2006): 66–80.
 Consuegra, David. American Type Design & Designers. Allworth Communications, Inc., 2004, p. 26.

Publications by Thibaudeau
 Thibaudeau, Francis. La Lettre D'Imprimerie. Paris: Bureau de l'édition, 1921.
 Thibaudeau, Francis. Manuel français de typographie moderne. Paris: Bureau de l'édition, 1924.

Notes

External links
 Brief biographical article at Typographie & Civilization 

1860 births
1925 deaths
French typographers and type designers